Rhiannan Iffland (born 9 September 1991) is an Australian high diver. She is a six-time consecutive Red Bull Cliff Diving World Series champion (2016-2019, 2021-2022). She won her first championship in 2016 as a wildcard entrant in her debut year, the first-ever rookie to do so.

Early life
Rhiannan Iffland was born in Newcastle, New South Wales, on 9 September 1991.
She grew up in Nords Wharf and trained at Belmont High School in trampolining with former world champion Brett Austine. After using her skills in a move to diving, from 2001 to 2006 she trained at the Hunter United Diving Academy, then joined the NSW Institute of Sport, training with future Olympic medallists Melissa Wu and Matthew Mitcham.

Iffland was a medallist in 2007 at the CAMO International Canadian Championships, in 2008 at the Elite Junior Diving Championships in Melbourne and at the 2009 Australian Youth Olympic Festival.

Professional career
Before joining the cliff diving circuit, Iffland worked as an acrobatic trampolining and diving entertainer on cruise ships in the Mediterranean and Caribbean and trained at a theme park in Lyon, France, where she eventually attained dive heights of 20 metres (66 feet).

Cliff diving
In 2015, Iffland was granted a wildcard entry to compete in the opening event of the 2016 Red Bull Cliff Diving World Series.

Competitors dive from heights of 20 metres and reach speeds of 85 km/h.

2016 world series
The 2016 Championship was held over a circuit of seven events at various venues.  The first event of the 2016 series was held at Possum Kingdom Lake in Texas. After her final dive, a back triple somersault with twist, she was over 10 points ahead and won the round one event. In round two of the championship, held in July at Vila Franca do Campo, Portugal, Iffland again placed first.

In the third round held at Polignano a Mare, Italy in August, she finished second. The fourth round was held in September at Abereiddy's Blue Lagoon in Pembrokeshire, Wales and saw Iffland again awarded first place. Round five, also in September, was held at Mostar where divers leapt from the historic Stari Most bridge; Iffland placed third.

Shirahama in Japan was the location for the sixth round and again Iffland was placed first. By the seventh and final event she had won four rounds and been placed second and third in the other two events. Iffland only needed one dive to be unbeatable by points.

The final event was held at the Dubai Marina in October and, for the first time, saw competitors diving at night under lights. Iffland took her fifth event victory and was named the 2016 champion. As winner of the 2016 championship, Iffland will have automatic entry to the 2017 world series.

2017 world series

The opening event of the 2017 world series was held on 24 June at Serpent's Lair Inis Mór in Ireland. Iffland won this first round, finishing 50 points ahead of the second place-getter.

References

External links

Sydney Morning Herald Photo Gallery

1991 births
Living people
Australian female divers
Female high divers
Sportswomen from New South Wales
World Aquatics Championships medalists in high diving
20th-century Australian women
21st-century Australian women